Sergey Nikolaevich Peskov (1948–2014) was a Soviet-Russian diplomat who served as the Russian Ambassador to Pakistan from 2005 to 2009, and Russian Ambassador to Oman (2011–2013). He is the father of Dmitry Peskov who is the Press Secretary for the President of Russia, Vladimir Putin.

References

1948 births
2014 deaths
Soviet diplomats
Ambassadors of Russia to Pakistan
Russian expatriates in Pakistan
Ambassadors of Russia to Oman
Peskov family